Ch'iyar Jaqhi (Aymara ch'iyara black, jaqhi precipice, cliff, "black cliff", Hispanicized spelling Chiar Jakke) is a  mountain in the Andes of Bolivia. It is situated in the Potosí Department, Antonio Quijarro Province, in the north of the Tomave Municipality. Ch'iyar Jaqhi lies south-west of the mountain Kunturiri Mayqu and east of the mountain Sirk'i. The river Ch'iyar Jaqhi originates north of the mountain. It flows to the south-east.

References 

Mountains of Potosí Department